A list of films produced by the Tollywood (Bengali language film industry) based in Kolkata in the year 1961.

Critically acclaimed films of 1961

 Komal Gandhar
 Agnisanskar
 Teen Kanya [Awards: Won the President's Award, India, 1961, Silver Medal for Samapti, XI Melbourne Film Festival (Australia), 1962, Golden Boomerang (Grand Prix) for Postmaster & Samapti and Laurel Award for Postmaster & Samapti]
 Jhinder Bandi
 Necklace
 Punascha [Award: Won the President's Award, India, 1961, Regional Certificate of Merit]
 Saptapadi [Award: Won the President's Award, India, 1961, Regional Certificate of Merit and a Silver Prize at the 3rd Moscow International Film Festival]
 Dui Bhai

A-Z of films

References

1961
Bengali
Films, Bengali